This is a list of Danish television related events from 2016.

Events
13 February - Lighthouse X are selected to represent Denmark at the 2016 Eurovision Song Contest with their song "Soldiers of Love". They are selected to be the forty-fourth Danish Eurovision entry during Dansk Melodi Grand Prix held at the Forum Horsens in Horsens.
19 March - 23-year-old Rubik's Cube solver Matias Rasmussen wins the second season of Danmark har talent. 
1 April - Embrace win the ninth season of X Factor.
25 November - Boxer Sarah Mahfoud and her partner Morten Kjeldgaard win the thirteenth season of Vild med dans.

Debuts

Television shows

1990s
Hvem vil være millionær? (1999–present)

2000s
Vild med dans (2005–present)
X Factor (2008–present)

2010s
Voice – Danmarks største stemme (2011–present)
Danmark har talent (2014–present)

Ending this year

Births

Deaths

See also
 2016 in Denmark